Pitchford is a small village and civil parish in the English county of Shropshire. It is also a surname. Notable people with the surname include:

Christopher Pitchford (1947–2017), British judge
Dean Pitchford (born 1951), American songwriter, screenwriter, director, actor, and novelist
Denys Watkins-Pitchford (1905–1990), English naturalist, illustrator, and writer
Frank Pitchford (1935–1990), English rugby league player
Geoff Pitchford (born 1936), British skier and Olympics competitor
Harry Pitchford (1891–1965), English cricketer
Herbert Watkins-Pitchford (1868–1951), British veterinarian
John H. Pitchford (1857–1923), American attorney and judge
Larry Pitchford (born 1936), American wrestler and musician
Len Pitchford (1900–1992), English cricketer
Liam Pitchford (born 1993), English table tennis player and Olympics competitor
Lonnie Pitchford (1955–1998), American blues guitarist, singer, and instrument maker
Max Pitchford (1903–1968), Australian rules footballer
Randy Pitchford (born 1971), American video game producer
Richard Valentine Pitchford (1895–1973), British magician
Steve Pitchford (born 1952), English rugby league player
Thomas J. Pitchford, state senator in North Carolina
Walter Pitchford (born 1992), American basketball player

See also
Pickford (disambiguation)
Pitchford (disambiguation)